Mark Strong (born Marco Giuseppe Salussolia; 5 August 1963), is a British actor, best known for his film roles such as Prince Septimus in Stardust (2007), Archibald in RocknRolla (2008), Lord Henry Blackwood in Sherlock Holmes (2009), Frank D'Amico in Kick-Ass (2010), Jim Prideaux in Tinker Tailor Soldier Spy (2011), Sinestro in Green Lantern (2011), George in Zero Dark Thirty (2012), Major General Stewart Menzies in The Imitation Game (2014), Merlin in Kingsman: The Secret Service (2014) and Kingsman: The Golden Circle (2017), Dr. Thaddeus Sivana in Shazam! (2019) and Shazam! Fury of the Gods (2023), and John in Cruella (2021).

Early life
Strong was born Marco Giuseppe Salussolia in the Islington district of London on 5 August 1963, the son of an Austrian mother and an Italian father. His father left the family soon after Strong's birth, and Strong was brought up by his mother while she worked as an au pair. He later said, "The home I grew up in was a flat in Myddelton Square in London's Islington, a beautiful Georgian square with a huge church in the middle. We moved around a lot when I was young. I remember flats in Walthamstow, Clapton, Stoke Newington, and Edmonton." He said in 2008 that he was inspired to become an actor by watching French actor Alain Delon, but clarified in 2019 that he did not actually consider acting as a career until he was older.

When Strong was little, his mother legally changed his name to help him fit in with his English peers. He was baptised a Catholic. He attended Wymondham College in Morley, Norfolk, where he sang in two punk bands, the Electric Hoax and Private Party—the latter's name based on the idea that people wouldn't attend their shows, thinking they were private parties. Strong had ambitions to become a lawyer but returned to London after one year of studying German law at the Ludwig Maximilian University of Munich. He subsequently studied English and drama at Royal Holloway, University of London before attending the Bristol Old Vic Theatre School.

Career

Strong appeared in two Prime Suspect serials for ITV as Inspector (later Detective Chief Superintendent) Larry Hall, in Prime Suspect 3 (1993) and Prime Suspect 6 (2003). He also had starring roles in two BBC Two drama serials, Our Friends in the North (1996) and The Long Firm (2004), earning a BAFTA nomination for the latter. He also played the villainous Colonel Brand in Sharpe's Mission (1996). He portrayed the romantic lead, Mr. Knightley, in the 1996 ITV adaptation of Jane Austen's novel Emma. He then played the role of Steve in the 1997 film adaptation of Nick Hornby's Fever Pitch.

At the beginning of the 2000s, Strong appeared in Heartlands and in Shakespeare's Twelfth Night at the Donmar Warehouse, for which he was nominated for the 2003 Laurence Olivier Award for Best Performance in a Supporting Role. He was later featured in Roman Polanski's Oliver Twist (2005), played Mussawi in the film Syriana (2005), and played an assassin named Sorter in Revolver (2005). He portrayed the traitorous Wictred in Tristan & Isolde, showing his talent with swordplay, and since 2006, he has provided the narration in the BBC's genealogy series Who Do You Think You Are?.

In 2007, Strong was one of the final two actors considered for the part of Anton Chigurh in No Country for Old Men; despite the persistence of rumours, he claims he was never offered the part. He was Pinbacker, the insane captain of Icarus I in Sunshine (2007). Also in 2007, he portrayed Prince Septimus, the youngest of the seven Stormhold princes, in Stardust.

In 2008, he played Nick Calderelli in Miss Pettigrew Lives for a Day, Mannie Miesel in Flashbacks of a Fool, Finn in Babylon A.D., Archy in RocknRolla, and Philipp Bouhler in Good. Also in 2008, he portrayed Hani Salaam, the Jordanian intelligence chief and director of the feared GID in Body of Lies, marking his first collaboration with English director Ridley Scott. Strong's performance as Hani Salaam earned him a nomination for the London Critics Circle Film Award for Best British Supporting Actor, and his performance was mentioned by several critics, with Scott calling it "a marvel of exotic suavity and cool insinuation" while Ebert "particularly admired" his aura of suave control.

In 2009, Strong played a lead part in the Channel 4 film Endgame, and he played Lord Blackwood, the main villain, in Sherlock Holmes, who has somehow returned after his execution with a plot to take over the British Empire using an arsenal of dark arts and new technologies. It was his third project with director Guy Ritchie. He went on to work with Ridley Scott a second time in the 2010 epic adventure film Robin Hood, portraying antagonist Sir Godfrey. That year, he also played Frank D'Amico, the head of a criminal organisation, in Kick-Ass. Strong says he is drawn to playing antagonists, trying to "understand the purpose of the character" and building a believable individual.

In 2011, Strong played Thaal Sinestro, Green Lantern and Hal Jordan's mentor, in the superhero film Green Lantern. Strong said the film "closely follows the early comics" and elaborated, "Sinestro starts out as Hal Jordan's mentor, slightly suspicious and not sure of him." Strong went on to state that the character "is a military guy but isn't immediately bad". He also revealed that the outfit and other aspects of the character very closely follow the character's early days. Also in 2011, he voiced Pod in The Secret World of Arrietty and Captain Titus of the Ultramarines Chapter in the video game Warhammer 40,000: Space Marine. The same year, and most notably, he played the role of Jim Prideaux in the film adaptation of Tinker Tailor Soldier Spy, which was earlier played by Ian Bannen in the iconic original 1979 BBC series starring Alec Guinness. The film premiered in competition at the 68th Venice International Film Festival on 5 September 2011.

Strong played Clive Cornell in The Guard (2011), which is the most successful independent Irish film of all time in terms of Irish box-office receipts, overtaking The Wind that Shakes the Barley (2006). He next portrayed the role of Jacob Sternwood in the British thriller Welcome to the Punch. He played Matai Shang, the leader of the Therns in John Carter (2012), and starred in the action thriller film Zero Dark Thirty (2012). The film had its premiere in Los Angeles on 19 December 2012 and had its wide release on 11 January 2013. The film received wide critical acclaim and was nominated for five Academy Awards, including Best Picture.

In November 2012, Strong was cast in Mindscape, a film in which a man with the ability to enter people's memories begins working on the case of a brilliant but problematic teenager to determine whether she is a sociopath or the victim of trauma. The film came to American cinemas in June 2014. Jaguar Cars produced an advertisement in 2014, initially shown during Super Bowl XLVIII and later online and on television, featuring Strong alongside fellow English actors Ben Kingsley and Tom Hiddleston. It was themed around their recent film roles as villains, and used the tagline "it's good to be bad". That same year, Strong co-starred in the historical drama film The Imitation Game as MI6 chief Stewart Menzies.

In 2015, Strong won the Olivier Award for Best Actor for his role in A View from the Bridge, which he starred in as Eddie Carbone at the Young Vic. When Strong went over to perform the play on Broadway in New York, he received similar levels of acclaim, and was nominated for the Drama Desk Award for Outstanding Actor in a Play, and the Tony Award for Best Actor in a Play, for his performance. In 2016, he co-starred with Sacha Baron Cohen in the action-comedy film Grimsby, playing a top MI6 secret agent with Cohen as his idiotic football hooligan brother. Later that year, he starred in a production of The Red Barn, by David Hare, which premiered in October 2016 at the National Theatre, (Lyttelton Stage), and co-starred in the political thriller Miss Sloane, directed by John Madden. The film premiered at the AFI Film Festival in November 2016.

Since 2017, Strong has narrated the pre-show etiquette clips presented before films at Vue Cinemas. In 2018, he starred in the hostage thriller Stockholm, and had the leading role in Fox network's Deep State, an espionage thriller in which he portrays an ex-spy named Max Easton, who after the death of his son, is brought out of retirement unwillingly, to avenge his death. In 2019, he portrayed the villain Doctor Thaddeus Sivana in the superhero film Shazam!. In the same year, Strong appeared briefly as the British Captain Smith in Sam Mendes’ World War I film 1917.

In March 2020, Strong narrated public information films for the UK government which outlined how the British public should approach daily life during the COVID-19 pandemic.

In March 2021, Strong was the castaway on BBC Radio 4's Desert Island Discs. Later that same year, he co-starred in the Disney comedy-drama film Cruella.

In the media
GQ magazine named Strong as one of its 50 best dressed men in 2015. He has named David Bowie as his style icon.

Personal life
Strong is married to television producer Liza Marshall, with whom he has two sons named Gabriel and Roman. They live in North London, which Strong discussed in 2007: "I've got no desire to live anywhere else. I was born here, my wife was born here, my kids were born here, and this is where we're going to stay. [...] I'm able to keep my head below the parapet. I get on with my work, I have a family, and I get on the Tube. It just so happens that I'm doing this job."

Strong is a lifelong fan of Arsenal FC. He has named Ace in the Hole, Blade Runner, His Girl Friday, The Night of the Hunter, This Is Spinal Tap, and the work of the Coen brothers as his favourite films. He speaks fluent German and some Italian, and provided the German dubbing for Daniel Craig's voice in Obsession when "German with an English accent" was required. He and Craig previously lived together, became friends, and co-starred in the BBC drama Our Friends in the North. Craig is also the godfather of Strong's son Roman.

Filmography

Film

Television

Radio

Stage

Video games

Awards and nominations

References

External links

 
 

1963 births
Living people
20th-century English male actors
21st-century English male actors
Alumni of Royal Holloway, University of London
Alumni of Bristol Old Vic Theatre School
English male film actors
English male Shakespearean actors
English male stage actors
English male television actors
English male voice actors
English people of Austrian descent
English people of Italian descent
Laurence Olivier Award winners
Male actors from London
People educated at Wymondham College
People from Islington (district)
Theatre World Award winners